Kunyi is a Bantu language spoken in the Republic of the Congo.

References

Kongo language